Dick Wilkinson (21 January 1903 – 20 September 1976) was an Australian rules footballer who played with Footscray in the Victorian Football League (VFL).

Notes

External links 
		

1903 births
1976 deaths
Australian rules footballers from Victoria (Australia)
Western Bulldogs players